Rohingya massacres may refer to:
 Rohingya genocide
 Chut Pyin massacre, massacre of Rohingya people by the Myanmar Army and armed locals on 26 August 2017
 Gu Dar Pyin massacre, massacre of Rohingya people by the Myanmar Army and armed locals on 27 August 2017
 Inn Din massacre, massacre of Rohingya people by the Myanmar Army and armed locals on 30 August 2017
 Maung Nu massacre, massacre of Rohingya people by the Myanmar Army on 27 August 2017
 Tula Toli massacre, massacre of Rohingya people by the Myanmar Army on 2 September 2017

Rohingya massacres may also refer to:
 Arakan massacres in 1942